This article lists the discography of American rapper and singer Lil Mama.

Albums

Studio albums

Mixtapes

Singles

As lead artist

As featured artist

Promotional singles

Guest appearances

References

Discographies of American artists